Dhirenpara is a locality of Guwahati. It is situated in the eastern side of a beautiful high mountain. Dhirenpara is a little less developed than the rest of Guwahati.

Transport
Dhirenpara is connected to rest of city with city buses and other modes of transportation.

Facility
Maternity & Child Welfare Hospital has been established in Dhirepara.

Nearest Landmark
ACA cricket stadium is located at a distance of 1km from Dhirenpara.

Eminent personalities
Eminent child prodigy Lucky Rahman resides in Dhirenpara Itabhata near L.P School. He is a very skilled martial arts player. He recently visited Lumding for a competition.

See also
 Chandmari
 Paltan Bazaar
 Ganeshguri
 Maligaon

References

Neighbourhoods in Guwahati